This is a list of notable futures exchanges. Those stock exchanges that also offer trading in futures contracts besides trading in securities are listed both here and the list of stock exchanges.

Africa

Kenya
 Nairobi Securities Exchange (NEXT)

Nigeria
 Nigerian Stock Exchange (NSE)

South Africa
 South African Futures Exchange (SAFEX)

Asia

Eastern Asia

China
 China Financial Futures Exchange (CFFEX)
 Dalian Commodity Exchange (DCE)
 Shanghai Futures Exchange (SHFE)
 Zhengzhou Commodity Exchange (ZCE)
 Guangzhou Futures Exchange (GZFE)

Hong Kong
 Hong Kong Exchanges and Clearing (HKEx)
 Hong Kong Futures Exchange (HKFE) [merged]
 Hong Kong Stock Exchange (HKSE) [merged]
 London Metal Exchange (LME)
 Hong Kong Mercantile Exchange (HKMEx, defunct)

Japan
 Japan Exchange Group (JPX)
 Osaka Exchange (OSE)
 Tokyo Commodity Exchange (TOCOM)
 Osaka Dojima Commodity Exchange (ODEX)
 Tokyo Financial Exchange (TFX)

South Korea
 Korea Exchange (KRX), formed from merger of KOSDAQ

Taiwan
 Taiwan Futures Exchange (TAIFEX)

South-eastern Asia

Indonesia
 Indonesia Commodity and Derivatives Exchange (ICDX)
 Jakarta Futures Exchange (JFX)

Malaysia
 Bursa Malaysia

Philippines
 Manila Commodity Exchange (MCX)

Singapore
 Singapore Commodity Exchange (SICOM)
 Singapore Exchange (SGX)
 Singapore Mercantile Exchange (SMX)
 Asia Pacific Exchange (APEX)

Thailand
 Thailand Futures Exchange Public Company Limited (TFEX)
 Bond Electronic Exchange (BEX)
 Agricultural Futures Exchange of Thailand (AFET) (Closed on 1 November 2016)

Southern Asia

Bangladesh
 Chittagong Stock Exchange (CSE)
 Dhaka Stock Exchange (DSE)

India
 Bombay Stock Exchange (BSE)
 Indian Energy Exchange (IEX)
 Metropolitan Stock Exchange (MSEI) (Formerly known as MCX-SX)
 Multi Commodity Exchange (MCX) 
 National Commodity and Derivatives Exchange (NCDEX) 
 National Spot Exchange
 National Stock Exchange of India (NSE)
 Petroleum Exchange of India (PetEx)

Iran
 Iran Mercantile Exchange
 Iranian Energy Exchange (IRENEX)
 Iranian oil bourse
 Tehran Stock Exchange

Nepal
 Commodity Futures Exchange Limited (CFX)
 Nepal Derivative Exchange Limited (NDEX)
 Commodity and Metal Exchange Limited (COMEN)
 MEX Nepal (MEX)

Pakistan
 Pakistan Stock Exchange (PSX)
 Karachi Stock Exchange (KSE) merged into PSX
 Pakistan Mercantile Exchange (PMEX), formerly National Commodity Exchange Limited (NCEL)

Western Asia

Turkey
 Turkish Derivatives Exchange (TURDEX, in Turkish: Vadeli İşlem ve Opsiyon Borsası or VOB)

United Arab Emirates
 Dubai Gold & Commodities Exchange
 Dubai Mercantile Exchange (DME)
 NASDAQ Dubai
 ICE Futures Abu Dhabi

Europe

Pan-European
 BlueNext
 Eurex Exchange
 Euronext
 European Climate Exchange
 European Energy Exchange
 NASDAQ OMX Commodities Europe
 OMX

Austria
 Energy Exchange Austria

Belgium
 BELFOX (Belgian Futures & Options Exchange)

Czechia
 OTE,  emission market, Prague

France
 Euronext Paris

Germany
 Eurex Exchange (EUREX), part of Deutsche Börse Group
 European Energy Exchange (EEX), part of Deutsche Börse Group - commodity exchange

Greece
 Athens Stock Exchange, Derivatives Market

Hungary
 Budapest Stock Exchange (BSE)

Norway
 Imarex

Poland
 GPW (Warsaw Stock Exchange)

Romania
 Bursa de Valori București (BVB) (Bucharest Stock Exchange)

Russia
 Moscow Exchange
 Moscow Interbank Currency Exchange (MICEX) (merged, 2012)
 RTS Stock Exchange (RTS) (merged, 2012)

Serbia
 Belgrade Stock Exchange (BELEX)

Slovakia
 Commodity Exchange Bratislava (CEB)

Spain
 Mercado Español de Futuros Financieros (MEFF)

Ukraine
 Ukrainian Exchange (UX)

United Kingdom
 Baltic Exchange
 ICE Futures Europe (owned by Intercontinental Exchange), formerly London International Financial Futures and Options Exchange (LIFFE) and International Petroleum Exchange (IPE)
 London Metal Exchange (LME, owned by Hong Kong Exchanges and Clearing)

North America

Canada
 Montreal Exchange (MX) (owned by the TMX Group)

Mexico
 Mexican Derivatives Exchange (MexDer)

United States
 Chicago Board Options Exchange (CBOE / CFE)
 CME Group
 International Monetary Market (IMM)
 Chicago Board of Trade (CBOT) (Since 2007 a Designated Contract Market owned by the CME Group)
 Chicago Mercantile Exchange (CME / GLOBEX) (Since 2007 a Designated Contract Market owned by the CME Group)
 New York Mercantile Exchange (NYMEX) and (COMEX) (Since 2008 Designated Contract Markets owned by the CME Group)
 Kansas City Board of Trade (KCBT) (Since 2012, a Designated Contract Market owned by the CME Group)
 NEX Group plc (NXG.L) (Since 2018, a Swap Execution Facility owned by the  CME Group)
 Intercontinental Exchange (ICE)
 International Petroleum Exchange (IPE) 2001
 New York Board of Trade (NYBOT) 2005
 Winnipeg Commodity Exchange (WCE) 2007
 TSX Group's Natural Gas Exchange Partnership 2008
 European Climate Exchange 2010
 Chicago Climate Exchange (CCE) 2010
 NYSE 2013
 London International Financial Futures and Options Exchange (LIFFE) 2013 (from NYSE Euronext)
 Minneapolis Grain Exchange (MGEX)
 Nadex (formerly HedgeStreet)
 OneChicago (Single-stock futures (SSF's) and Futures on ETFs, defunct)
 Nasdaq Futures Exchange (NFX, defunct)
 The Small Exchange (SMFE)

Oceania

Australia 
 Australian Securities Exchange (ASX)
 Financial and Energy Exchange (FEX Global)

New Zealand 
 New Zealand Exchange

South America

Argentina
 Mercado a Término de Buenos Aires
 Mercado Abierto Electrónico
 ROFEX (Rosario Futures Exchange)

Brazil
 BM&F Bovespa

See also
 List of financial regulatory authorities by country
 List of stock exchanges
 List of stock market indices

References 

Finance lists